The following is a list of awards and nominations received by Greek-French filmmaker, Costa-Gavras. Gavras won multiple awards and honours, both nationally and internationally.

Academy Awards

Amandaprisen

Athens International Film Festival

Berlin Film Festival

British Academy Film Awards

Cannes Film Festival

Catalonia International Prize

César Awards

CinEuphoria Awards

Cineuropa

COLCOA

Copenhagen International Film Festival

David di Donatello Awards

Directors Guild of America Awards

Edgar Allan Poe Awards

Efebo d'oro

European Film Awards

Étoiles de cristal

Festival Internacional de Cine de Huesca

Festival Internacional de Cine de San Cristóbal de las Casas

Film by the Sea

FIPRESCI

Flaiano Prizes

Francophone Film Festival of Greece

Globo d'oro

Golden Globe Awards

Gopo Awards

Goya Awards

Havana Film Festival

Hellenic Film Academy Awards

Human Rights Watch Film Festival

IFG Awards

Istanbul Film Festival

Italian National Syndicate of Film Journalists

Kansas City Film Critics Circle

LiberPress

Lisbon & Estoril Film Festival

Locarno Film Festival

London Film Critics' Circle

Louis Delluc Prize

Lumières Award

Magritte Awards

Monte-Carlo Film Festival

Moscow International Film Festival

Mostra de València

Mumbai International Film Festival

Munich International Film festival

National Board of Review

National Society of Film Critics Awards

New York Film Critics Circle

Online Film & Television Association

Premios ASECAN

Prix France Culture Cinéma

Prix Jean-Zay

Pune International Film Festival

SACD Awards

San Sebastián Film Festival

Sant Jordi Awards

Sofia International Film Festival

Terenci Moix International Award

Trophées du Film français

Turkish Film Critics Association

Valladolid International Film Festival

Venice Film Festival

Writers Guild of America Awards

Zurich Film Festival

Honours
 Honorary Doctorate of Instituto Superior de Arte – 2003
 Doctor of Fine Arts of Simon Fraser University – 2006
 Honorary Doctorate of Université libre de Bruxelles – 2012
 Honorary Doctorate of the Film School of the Aristotle University – 2013
 Honorary Doctorate of the Faculty of Letters, University of Cyprus – 2013
 Honorary Doctorate of Complutense University of Madrid – 2016
 Honorary Doctorate of Aix-Marseille University – 2022
 Rector's Medal from Universidad de Chile – 2002
 Orden al Mérito Docente y Cultural "Gabriela Mistral" (Chile) – 2002
 Medalla Cineteca Nacional – 2015
 Officier de l'ordre national du Mérite – 2000
 Commandeur de la Légion d'honneur – 2019
 Gold Medal of Merit in the Fine Arts (Spain) – 1985
 Order of Arts and Letters of Spain – 2011
 Athir of the National Order of Merit (Algeria) – 2018

References

Costa-Gavras